Jane Means Pierce (née Appleton; March 12, 1806 – December 2, 1863) was the wife of Franklin Pierce and the first lady of the United States from 1853 to 1857. She married Franklin Pierce, then a Congressman, in 1834 despite her family's misgivings. She refused to live in Washington, D.C., and in 1842, she convinced her husband to retire from politics. He sought the Democratic presidential nomination without her knowledge in 1852 and was elected president later that year. Their only surviving son, Benjamin, was killed in a train accident prior to Franklin's inauguration, sending Jane into a deep depression that would afflict her for the rest of her life. Pierce was reclusive in her role as first lady, spending the first two years of her husband's presidency in a period of mourning for her son. Her duties at this time were often fulfilled by Abby Kent-Means. After the conclusion of Franklin's presidency they traveled abroad for two years before settling in Massachusetts. Pierce died of tuberculosis in 1863.

Pierce disliked political life and was unhappy in the role of first lady. She took interest in the issue of abolitionism, and she attempted to influence her husband's decisions on the subject during her time as first lady. Raised as a Puritan, Pierce was strictly religious, and she believed that the tragedies she suffered through her life were divine retribution for the sins of her and her husband. Jane is described as an opposite of her husband, who was outgoing, political, and a heavy drinker in contrast to her reclusive nature, aversion to politics, and teetotalism.

Early life 
Jane Appleton was born in Hampton, New Hampshire on March 12, 1806 to Congregationalist minister Jesse Appleton and his wife Elizabeth Means Appleton. The Appleton family grew to a total of six children: three elder daughters, of which Jane was the third, and three younger sons. Their father became president of Bowdoin College in 1807, and the family settled in Brunswick, Maine (then part of Massachusetts). Her father's religious practices included a strict fasting diet that caused his health to decline, leading to his death in 1819. After his death, the family lived with Elizabeth's mother in Amherst, New Hampshire. In her childhood, Appleton acquired a devotion to Puritan, evangelical Calvinism.

Appleton came from a well-off and well-connected New England family. Jane's education was of a high quality, consisting of both public schooling and homeschooling. She attended the prestigious Miss Catherine Fiske's Young Ladies Seminary in Keene, New Hampshire, where she received an education that was a higher quality than typically accessible to women. She was naturally talented in music and enthusiastic about literature, but she declined to pursue these further in favor of Bible study. As she approached young adulthood, Appleton was shy, devoutly religious, and pro-temperance. Even in her youth, her health was poor; she would regularly contract severe winter colds.

Marriage and family 
Appleton met Franklin Pierce after he moved to Amherst to study law at Bowdoin. One anecdote suggests that they met during a thunderstorm when he implored her not to sit under a tree for risk of lightning strikes. Another suggests that they were introduced by Alpheus Packard, Jane's brother-in-law and one of Franklin's professors. She may also have met him while he was visiting her mother's home. Appleton's family opposed the relationship for a number of reasons, including their difference in class, his poor manners, his drinking, his tolerance of slavery, his Episcopalian beliefs, and his political aspirations. They courted for seven years, including a period of time in which Franklin moved to Hillsborough, New Hampshire to practice law and serve in the New Hampshire General Court. Franklin and Jane married in a small ceremony on November 19, 1834, by which time Franklin was a member of the House of Representatives. They were seen as opposites, Jane's reclusiveness and depression contrasting with Franklin's gregariousness and public aspirations.

The Pierces went together to Washington, D.C. after their marriage, but Jane found the city unpleasant. In 1835, she attended the White House New Year's Day reception with her husband where she met President Andrew Jackson. She decided to leave the city later that year, returning to her mother's home in Amherst while her husband remained in Washington. The Pierces later purchased a home in Hillsborough where Jane chose to live while Franklin was away. They moved to Concord, New Hampshire in 1838 while Franklin was a senator, and Jane encouraged him to resign and retire from politics in 1842. Jane abhorred politics, and her distaste for the subject created a tension that would continue throughout her husband's political ascent. Though politics was often a point of debate or argument between the two, they were otherwise warm with one another and wrote to each other regularly when apart.

Franklin and Jane had three sons, all of whom died in childhood. Franklin Jr. was born in 1836 and died three days after his birth. Frank Robert was born in 1839 and died in 1843 at the age of four from epidemic typhus. Benjamin was born in 1841 and died in 1853 at the age of 11 in a train accident. Following the end of her husband's term in the Senate, Pierce was able to live a domestic life with her family together at home. Franklin provided for the family with his law practice, though he briefly went away to serve as a brigadier general in the Mexican–American War. This period of Jane's life is often regarded as when she was happiest, as her husband was out of politics and she still had two surviving sons. Their house was sold during the war, and the family made various living arrangements over the following months. President James K. Polk offered Franklin an appointment as United States Attorney General, but he turned it down due to Jane's objection. After the death of their second son, Pierce focused on raising their only surviving son, Benjamin, in a strict religious manner while her husband operated his law practice. She wholly dedicated herself to Benjamin and avoided any obligations beyond her family and her religion. Pierce did not carry out housework due to her health, so it was carried out by a married couple that Franklin had hired to care for Jane and Benjamin while he was away.

First Lady of the United States
In 1852, Pierce's husband received the Democratic Party nomination for president. She is said to have fainted upon hearing the news. He had deceived her regarding his presidential aspirations, denying the extent to which he was actively seeking the office. He sought to pursuade her that if he became president, their son Benjamin would be more likely to become successful. Despite this, she regularly prayed that her husband would lose the presidential election. Her prayers went unanswered, as he was elected president by a large margin on November 7, 1852.

While Franklin was president-elect, a train with the Pierces on board derailed, and Benjamin was killed in front of his parents. Pierce went into a deeper depression after witnessing her final son's death, believing that God took their sons as a punishment for her husband's political aspirations. She did not attend his presidential inauguration, instead staying in Baltimore for two weeks. Pierce was also affected by the deaths of her predecessor Abigail Fillmore and Vice President William R. King over the following weeks.

For the first few months of her husband's term, Pierce did not take visitors and only sparingly attended public receptions, and she only entertained for family and friends. Upon arriving at the White House, she wore black and had the White House decorated for mourning. She did not host social events or supervise the White House in the traditional role of first lady, leaving these responsibilities to her aunt and close friend Abby Kent-Means. She avoided the company of others, regularly engaging in private Bible study. Pierce also developed a friendship with Varina Davis, wife of Secretary of War Jefferson Davis. She took an interest in the Davis's infant son, though he became ill and died in 1854. She gradually acclimated to life as First Lady, attending the New Year's reception two years into her husband's term and the Friday evening receptions thereafter. Pierce attempted to communicate with her late son while she was first lady, sometimes writing letters to him as an exercise in grief. She also attempted to contact him through a séance with the assistance of the Fox sisters, major figures in the Spiritualism movement.

As first lady, Pierce insisted on adherence to religious practice in the White House, instructing the staff to attend church and holding religious services in the White House library. Pierce's cousin Amos A. Lawrence described the effect that this had on her husband, saying that he was deeply pious in her presence while heavily drinking when she was away. She would also lobby her husband on occasion while he was president; in 1856, she convinced him to reverse the arrest of abolitionist Charles L. Robinson. During times of poor health, Franklin would invite many of her nieces and nephews to the White House to care for her. Taking an interest in abolitionism, she began attending Congressional debates after her period of mourning to follow the issue. At the end of her husband's term, she again declined to attend the presidential inauguration, this time of her husband's successor James Buchanan.

Later life and death
The Pierces lived in Washington for a month after the end of Franklin's presidential term and then toured New England during the summer. They traveled abroad for two years, returning home to purchase  of land in Concord before leaving to the West Indies. Pierce avoided Concord as it reminded her of her late son, and she often stayed with relatives in Massachusetts for the remainder of her life. During the American Civil War, she supported the Union and the cause of abolitionism, in contrast with her husband who supported the preservation of slavery in order to preserve the nation and the Constitution. Pierce's bouts of tuberculosis worsened in the years after leaving the White House, and she died on December 2, 1863. She was buried at Old North Cemetery in Concord; her husband was interred beside her following his death on October 8, 1869, aged 64. In her will, she gave donations to the American Bible Society, the American Society for Foreign Missions, and the American Colonization Society.

Public perception and legacy 

The general public's first impression of Pierce was in a biography of her husband written by family friend Nathaniel Hawthorne at the beginning of Franklin's campaign. It emphasized her poor health as her husband's reason for declining a role in the Polk administration, creating a reputation as a sickly woman that has persisted to the present day. During her time as first lady, Pierce was considered an invalid and seen as a depressing presence in a depressing White House, though she did receive sympathy from the people for her grief. During her tenure as first lady, Pierce was known as "the shadow of the White House". She did receive backlash from the public after canceling Saturday evening Marine Band concerts in view of the Sabbath. Hawthorne once wrote that she "wasn't really of this world."

Pierce is ranked poorly among historians, with polling showing that she is considered one of the least effectual first ladies. She is also one of the most obscure of the first ladies, having served in the role prior its having national prominence and during a presidency that has itself become obscure. Much like other antebellum first ladies, she has often been identified as avoiding the spotlight and being of little importance to her husband's administration. She is considered to have had little influence on the position of first lady and did not set precedent for her successors. Pierce's influence on her husband manifested through her dislike of politics, including her role in his decision to retire from the Senate in 1842. Some scholars have suggested that in the course of her relationship with her husband, she may have felt a religious compulsion to save his soul and courted him because of his vices rather than despite them. While contemporary perception of Pierce was generally one of sympathy, a trend among 20th century historians was to describe her as a hypochondriac that failed to support her husband during tragedy and to consider her as a damaging factor in her husband's poorly received presidency.

Political beliefs 
Pierce was a Puritan, and this formed the basis of her worldview. Her religious beliefs impressed on her the conviction that suffering was punishment from God. She strongly opposed the political and social culture of Washington, lamenting the regular parties and alcohol consumption. She was raised as a Whig, which caused conflict with her family when she married her husband, who served in office as a Democrat. She supported the temperance movement and opposed the consumption of alcohol. Pierce was also a supporter of the abolitionist movement in opposition to her husband's tolerance of slavery in the name of states' rights, and she wished for a Union victory during the American Civil War. Pierce admired Andrew Jackson while he was president. She disliked Representative Davy Crockett, believing him to be "conceited, stupid, [and] silly".

Notes

External links
 Letter to Benjamin Pierce from Jane Pierce after Benjamin's death
 Painting of Jane Pierce
Jane Pierce at C-SPAN's First Ladies: Influence & Image

1806 births
1863 deaths
19th-century American women
19th-century deaths from tuberculosis
First ladies of the United States
Appleton family
Burials in New Hampshire
Franklin Pierce family
Tuberculosis deaths in Massachusetts
People from Hampton, New Hampshire